Vitória das Missões is a municipality in the western part of the state of Rio Grande do Sul, Brazil. The population is 3,092 (2020 est.) in an area of 259.61 km². It is located 461 km west of the state capital of Porto Alegre, northeast of Alegrete and east of Argentina.  Its nickname is "Progress" (Progresso in Portuguese).

Bounding municipalities

Santo Ângelo
Entre-Ijuís
São Miguel das Missões
Caibaté
Guarani das Missões

References

External links
http://www.citybrazil.com.br/rs/vitoriadasmissoes/ 

Municipalities in Rio Grande do Sul